Herbert Whittaker Briggs (May 14, 1900 – January 6, 1990) was an American lawyer and professor at Cornell University.

Life 
Briggs was born in Wilmington, Delaware to Frederic F. Briggs and Eleanore A. Briggs (née Lewis), a grand-niece of manufacturer and philanthropist John Price Crozer. In 1921, Briggs was awarded a Bachelor of Arts from West Virginia University.  This was followed by doctoral studies at Johns Hopkins University; he received his Ph.D. in 1925. Briggs then worked as a lecturer at Oberlin College, before he moved to Cornell University in 1929. There he received a call in 1947 for a professorship at Cornell. He is considered one of the founders of the Department of Political Science at Cornell University. In addition, Briggs held a visiting professorship at the University of Copenhagen as part of the Fulbright program.

Briggs also had an impact on the international stage. He was a member of the International Law Commission between 1962 and 1966, represented Honduras, Spain and Libya in litigation before the International Court of Justice and, as a member of the American delegation, attended the Conference on the preparation of the Vienna Convention on the Law of Treaties. He was also active in numerous international arbitrations as a referee.

Memberships 
Briggs was a member of the Institut de Droit International an active in the American Society of International Law, presiding as president from 1959 to 1960. He was co-editor of  the American Journal of International Law from 1939 onward and editor-in-chief from 1955 to 1962 .

Honors 
In 1970 Briggs was elected to the American Academy of Arts and Sciences.

Publications (selection) 

 The doctrine of continuous voyage. The Johns Hopkins Press, Baltimore 1926.
 The Law of Nations: Cases. Documents and Notes . Crofts, New York 1938.
 The International Law Commission. Cornell University Press, Ithaca 1969.

Literature 

 Stephen M. Schwebel: . In: . Vol. 84, Nr. 2. American Society of International Law, 1990, ISSN 0002-9300, S. 531–532.
 George McT. Kahin: Herbert W. Briggs May 14, 1900 — January 6, 1990, Cornell University Faculty Memorial Statement.

1900 births
1990 deaths
Cornell University faculty
20th-century American lawyers
American Journal of International Law editors
Presidents of the American Society of International Law